Vexillum yangi is a species of sea snail, a marine gastropod mollusk, in the family Costellariidae, the ribbed miters.

Distribution
This species occurs in the following locations:
 Amami Island
 Taiwan

References

yangi
Gastropods described in 2017